UTPD may refer to:
University of Tennessee Police Department
University of Texas at Houston Police Department